The Dove is a small cirque glacier or perennial snowfield located in Rocky Mountain National Park in the U.S. state of Colorado. The Dove is on the north slope of Longs Peak and near The Keyhole, which is along a popular climbing route to the summit.

See also
List of glaciers in the United States

References

Glaciers of Rocky Mountain National Park
Landforms of Boulder County, Colorado